Mushom is a small farm in Vennesla municipality in Vest-Agder county, Norway.

The so-called "Øvrebø-ski" was found in a marsh at Mushom. For many years it was considered Norway's oldest preserved ski. The artifact can now be seen at the Holmenkollen Ski Museum in Oslo.

References

Vennesla
Villages in Agder